The 2008–09 season saw West Ham United compete in the Premier League, where the club finished in 9th place. The beginning of the season was overshadowed by the sudden resignation of manager Alan Curbishley, following the sale of first team players Anton Ferdinand and George McCartney to Sunderland - after Curbishley claimed that these transfers had been authorised without his consent - and the related financial troubles of the club's owners, brought on by the 2008 Icelandic Banking Crisis. The club's owners had their assets frozen by the UK government, with the club narrowly avoiding going into administration as a result. Curbishley was replaced by Italian former Chelsea forward Gianfranco Zola on 9 September.

The club recovered from its off-field troubles, and a relatively poor start to the season, to finish in the top half and were never seriously threatened with relegation after the turn of the year.

Final league table

Squad

Results

Premier League

League Cup

FA Cup

Statistics

Overview

Goalscorers

League position by matchday

Appearances and goals

|-
! colspan=12 style=background:#dcdcdc; text-align:center| Goalkeepers

|-
! colspan=12 style=background:#dcdcdc; text-align:center| Defenders

|-
! colspan=12 style=background:#dcdcdc; text-align:center| Midfielders

|-
! colspan=12 style=background:#dcdcdc; text-align:center| Forwards

|}

References

External links
West Ham United FC official website
West Ham United FC on Soccerbase

2008-09
2008–09 Premier League by team
2008 sports events in London
2009 sports events in London